Români may refer to:
the endonym of the Romanian people
Români, Neamț, a commune in Neamț County, Romania
Români, a village in Băbeni town, Vâlcea County, Romania
Români, the former name of Baurci-Moldoveni Commune, Cahul district, Moldova
Români (river), a tributary of the Bistrița in Neamț and Bacău Counties, Romania

See also
Name of Romania